Polish-American Roman Catholic parishes - founded by Polish immigrants in New England, United States from 1887. There are 78 Polish-American Roman Catholic parishes in 10 dioceses.

Fr. Franciszek Chalupka was the founder of the first Polish-American parishes in New England.

Resources 
 Dolores A. Liptak, "The Bishops of Hartford and the New Immigrants (1880-1920)", U.S. Catholic Historian, Vol. 1, No. 2 (Winter - Spring, 1981), pp. 37–53.
 The Official Catholic Directory in USA
 
 
 
 
 Roman Catholic Parishes of Polish Ethnicity in USA
 Cities & Towns in each Massachusetts Roman Catholic Diocese
 Archdiocese of Boston
 Diocese of Fall River
 Diocese of Springfield
 Diocese of Worcester
 Diocese of Manchester
 Diocese of Portland
 Archdiocese of Hartford
 Diocese of Bridgeport
 Diocese of Norwich
 Diocese of Providence
 Diocese of Burlington

See also